Ottavio Panciroli was an Italian historian and writer, born in 1554 in Reggio Emilia. He died on 14 March 1624 in Tivoli. He published several books, but was most famous for I tesori nascosti nell'alma città di Roma and Roma sacra e moderna (rough translation: "The treasures hidden in the haughty city of Rome" and "sacred and modern Rome").

The Via Ottavio Panciroli in Rome is named after him.

References

1554 births
1624 deaths
People from Reggio Emilia
16th-century Italian historians
17th-century Italian historians